Wilhelmshaven, also known as Wilhelmshaven Hauptbahnhof, is a railway station in Wilhelmshaven, Germany, on the Wilhelmshaven–Oldenburg railway. The trains are operated by NordWestBahn.

Train services
The station is served by the following:

Regional services  Wilhelmshaven - Varel - Oldenburg - Cloppenburg - Bramsche - Osnabrück
Local services  Esens - Sande - Wilhelmshaven

References

External links 
 

Railway stations in Lower Saxony
Railway stations in Germany opened in 1867